The Chungbuk-class was a class of 7 destroyers, formerly the United States' Gearing-class destroyer, that were transferred to and commissioned by the Republic of Korea Navy. They entered service in 1972, with the last one being decommissioned in 2001.

History 
These were ships used by the US Navy during World War II and were modernized in electronics and weaponry during FRAM II. They were once magnificent ships, which throughout the 1970s constituted the backbone of the Republic of Korea Navy as a replacement for Chungmu class destroyers. Eventually, they were deemed too outdated. However, they remained in service until well into the 1990s, when they were downright obsolete. They were all leased till 1977 then bought by the navy.

They received two destroyers of the Gearing class for the Republic of Korea Navy from the USA in 1972 as part of the American Military Assistance Program. More were later leased over in later years.

Ships in the class

Citations 

Destroyer classes
Chungbuk-class destroyers
Ships transferred from the United States Navy to the Republic of Korea Navy